Muhammad Irfan bin Shamsuddin (born 16 August 1995) is a Malaysian discus thrower who won a silver medal at the 2017 Asian Championships. He placed 12th and 5th at the 2014 and 2018 Asian Games, respectively.

References

Malaysian male discus throwers
1995 births
Living people
Athletes (track and field) at the 2014 Asian Games
Athletes (track and field) at the 2018 Asian Games
Southeast Asian Games gold medalists for Malaysia
Southeast Asian Games medalists in athletics
Competitors at the 2013 Southeast Asian Games
Competitors at the 2015 Southeast Asian Games
Competitors at the 2017 Southeast Asian Games
Competitors at the 2019 Southeast Asian Games
Asian Games competitors for Malaysia
Competitors at the 2021 Southeast Asian Games
20th-century Malaysian people
21st-century Malaysian people